Coffee & Kareem is a 2020 American action comedy film directed by Michael Dowse and written by Shane Mack. It stars Ed Helms, Terrence Little Gardenhigh, Betty Gilpin, RonReaco Lee, Andrew Bachelor, David Alan Grier and Taraji P. Henson, and follows a bumbling Detroit cop who must rescue his girlfriend and her 12-year-old son from gangsters after the boy witnesses a murder.

It was released on April 3, 2020, by Netflix. The film received generally negative reviews from critics, who called it an "awkward blend of kid-friendly premise and thoroughly adult humor".

Plot
While police officer James Coffee (Ed Helms) enjoys his new relationship with Vanessa Manning (Taraji P. Henson), her beloved 12-year-old son Kareem (Terrence Little Gardenhigh) plots their break-up.

Attempting to scare away his mom's boyfriend for good, Kareem tries to hire criminal fugitive Orlando Johnson (RonReaco Lee) to take him out. Before doing so, he both witnesses a shooting and accidentally exposes a secret network of criminal activity involving drugs and dirty cops, which makes his family its latest target. To protect Vanessa, Kareem teams up with Coffee - the partner he never wanted - for a dangerous chase across Detroit, trying to stay alive.

It is revealed that Coffee's Captain Hill (David Alan Grier) and Detective Watts (Betty Gilpin) are the bad cops. Watts murders Hill and ultimately kidnaps Vanessa and Kareem. Coffee is able to rescue them, and the cops bust Watts's drug deal, with some help from Johnson, who never really wanted to be in drugs in the first place.

Watts survives the explosion of the drug warehouse and tries to shoot Coffee, but Vanessa shoots her. Kareem finally admits that he's okay with Coffee dating his mom.

Cast
 Ed Helms as James Coffee
 Terrence Little Gardenhigh as Kareem Manning 
 Taraji P. Henson as Vanessa Manning
 Betty Gilpin as Detective Linda Watts
 RonReaco Lee as Orlando Johnson
 Andrew Bachelor as Rodney
 David Alan Grier as Captain Hill

Production
In March 2019, it was announced Ed Helms and Taraji P. Henson joined the cast of the film, with Michael Dowse directing from a screenplay by Shane Mack. Helms and Mike Falbo producing under their Pacific Electric banner, with Netflix distributing. In May 2019, Terrence Little Gardenhigh, Betty Gilpin, Andrew Bachelor, RonReaco Lee and David Alan Grier joined the cast of the film.

Filming
Principal photography began on April 22, 2019, in British Columbia. It wrapped on June 4.

Release
The movie was digitally released on Netflix on April 3, 2020.

Reception
The site's critical consensus reads: "An awkward blend of kid-friendly premise and thoroughly adult humor, Coffee & Kareem proves a distinctly unarresting odd couple comedy." On Metacritic, the film has a weighted average score of 35 out of 100, based on 20 critics, indicating "generally unfavorable reviews".

References

External links
 

2020 films
American action comedy films
2020s buddy comedy films
2020s police comedy films
Films directed by Michael Dowse
Films scored by Joseph Trapanese
Films set in Detroit
English-language Netflix original films
Films produced by Mike Falbo
Films produced by Ed Helms
Films with screenplays by Shane Mack
2020 action comedy films
2020s English-language films
2020s American films